Shosei-en Garden (渉成園) is a garden in Kyoto, Japan.

External links
 

Gardens in Kyoto Prefecture
Tourist attractions in Kyoto